Conus suratensis, common name the Surat cone, is a species of sea snail, a marine gastropod mollusk in the family Conidae, the cone snails and their allies.

Like all species within the genus Conus, these snails are predatory and venomous. They are capable of "stinging" humans, therefore live ones should be handled carefully or not at all.

Description
The size of the shell varies between 40 mm and 161 mm.
The color of the shell is yellow or orange-brown, with revolving series of numerous spots, and short lines of chocolate upon narrow white bands. The more rugose growth lines cause them to be rather
regularly interrupted, so that they form longitudinal as well as revolving series. The spire is radiated with chocolate. The base of the shell is strongly grooved.

Distribution
This marine species occurs in the Indo-Pacific off the Andaman and Nicobar Islands, in the Andaman Sea, off Bangladesh, in the Bay of Bengal, off Eastern Indi, off Indo-Malaysia, off Madagascar, off Myanmar (Burma), off the Solomon Islands, off Sri Lanka, off Thailand and off Australia (Queensland).

References

 Bruguière, J. G., and Hwass, C. H., 1792. Cone. Encyclopédie Méthodique: Histoire Naturelle des Vers, 1: 586 -757
 Cernohorsky, W.O. 1978. Tropical Pacific Marine Shells. Sydney : Pacific Publications 352 pp., 68 pls.
 Röckel, D., Korn, W. & Kohn, A.J. 1995. Manual of the Living Conidae. Volume 1: Indo-Pacific Region. Wiesbaden : Hemmen 517 pp.
 Tucker J.K. & Tenorio M.J. (2009) Systematic classification of Recent and fossil conoidean gastropods. Hackenheim: Conchbooks. 296 pp. 
 Puillandre N., Duda T.F., Meyer C., Olivera B.M. & Bouchet P. (2015). One, four or 100 genera? A new classification of the cone snails. Journal of Molluscan Studies. 81: 1–23

External links
 The Conus Biodiversity website
 Cone Shells – Knights of the Sea
 

suratensis
Gastropods described in 1792